Antônio da Silva Terezo (7 October 1953 – 7 May 2013), known as Terezo, was a Brazilian footballer who played as a defender. He competed in the men's tournament at the 1972 Summer Olympics.

References

External links
 

1953 births
2013 deaths
Footballers from Rio de Janeiro (city)
Brazilian footballers
Association football defenders
Brazil international footballers
Olympic footballers of Brazil
Footballers at the 1972 Summer Olympics